Maliakhal Anthony Prajusha (born 20 May 1987) is an Indian track and field athlete from Kerala who competes in long jump and triple jump. She held the Indian National record for triple jump with a mark of 13.72 m. She broke the record held by Mayookha Johny by four centimeter.

Early life
Prajusha was born on 20 May 1987 in Thrissur, a district in Kerala state, India.

Career
Prajusha's personal best for triple jump is 13.72 m, an Indian National record set during the 2010 Commonwealth Games on 8 October 2010. She broke Mayookha Johny's two-month-old record by four centimeter while improving her personal best by a massive .

Her personal best for long jump is 6.55 m set in Bangalore on 5 June 2010 during the second Indian Grand Prix.

Prajusha is training under the Sports Authority Of India (SAI) for the last 10 years with her coach, M.A. George. She works with Indian Railways and trains under M.A. George, a coach at the  Sports Authority of India.

Awards
She became only the fourth Indian woman to cross 6.50 m, joining Anju Bobby George (6.83 m), J. J. Shobha (6.66 m), and Pramila Aiyappa. She won the gold medal for her effort. 
At 2010 Commonwealth Games, Prajusha won silver medal in the women's long jump of the track and field event in Delhi.

References

External links

WITH A SPRING IN THEIR STEPS...
Asian Top 10 - 2010

Living people
1987 births
Sportswomen from Kerala
Indian female long jumpers
Indian female triple jumpers
21st-century Indian women
21st-century Indian people
People from Thrissur district
Commonwealth Games silver medallists for India
Athletes (track and field) at the 2010 Commonwealth Games
Athletes (track and field) at the 2010 Asian Games
Athletes (track and field) at the 2014 Asian Games
Commonwealth Games medallists in athletics
Athletes from Kerala
Asian Games competitors for India
Medallists at the 2010 Commonwealth Games